The 426th Maryland General Assembly convened in a regular session on January 14, 2009, and adjourned sine die on April 13, 2009.

Senate

Party composition

Leadership

Members

Notes
 This Senator was originally appointed to office by the Governor to fill an open seat.

 The President of the Senate does not serve on any of the four standing legislative committees. He does, however, serve on both the Executive Nominations and the Rules Committees.

House of Delegates

Party composition

Leadership

Members

Notable legislation enacted
 Senate Bill 279 - Death Penalty Restricts the use of the death penalty to cases in which the State presents the court or jury with (1) biological evidence or DNA evidence that links the defendant with the act of murder; (2) a videotaped, voluntary interrogation and confession of the defendant to the murder; or (3) a video recording that conclusively links the defendant to the murder. The bill also prohibits a defendant from being sentenced to death if the State relies solely on evidence provided by eyewitnesses.
 House Bill 387 - Verification of the lawful status of individuals seeking Maryland drivers licenses The 2005 REAL ID Act requires federal agencies to accept only personal identification cards that meet certain standards for official purposes. In order for Maryland to comply with the REAL ID Act the General Assembly passed HB 387. As of April 2009, Maryland was one of five states (along with Hawaii, New Mexico, Utah, and Washington) that extended the privilege to drive to individuals who do not have lawful status. HB 387 defines “lawful status” as it applies to the issuance of identification cards, driver’s licenses, and moped operator permits, and establishes a two-tiered approach to the issuance of these documents by the Motor Vehicle Administration (MVA), with the documents issued under one of these tiers considered invalid for certain official federal purposes. MVA may issue these documents, including driver’s licenses and the associated driving privilege, to an individual who held the document sought for renewal on April 18, 2009, regardless of lawful status or the absence of a valid Social Security number. However, MVA documents issued on or after July 1, 2010, must expire on July 1, 2015, and MVA may no longer undertake this two-tier issuance after July 1, 2015.

Notes

See also
 Current members of the Maryland State Senate

References
General
 
 
 
 

Specific

External links
 Maryland General Assembly

2009 in Maryland
Maryland legislative sessions